Charles Brownlow (25 July 1861 – 23 January 1924) was an Australian rules football administrator in the Victorian Football League (VFL), known for his forty-year association with the Geelong Football Club. The Brownlow Medal is named in his honour.

Early life
He was born in Geelong, Victoria, and went to The Geelong College for his schooling.

Football career
Brownlow played football with the Geelong Football Club in the Victorian Football Association (VFA), before the formation of the VFL, beginning his career in 1880 and playing regularly until 1884, with occasional games thereafter. He captained the club in 1883, leading it to a premiership in that season.

Following his playing career, Brownlow spent many years as an administrator. He was the Geelong Football Club secretary from 1885 to 1923, a year before his death. He served as Geelong's delegate on the Victorian Football League board from 1902 until 1922, and in that capacity as the VFL's vice-president and delegate to the Australasian Football Council from 1911 until 1916, and as chairman of the permit and umpires committee from 1911 until 1922. In addition to this, he was caretaker president of the VFL in 1918 and 1919. He became president of the Australasian Football Council in 1919, and served in that position until his death.

Brownlow married Matilda Jane Barber, and they had four children: Daisy, Ruby, Elsie, and Charles Junior. He primarily earned his living as a watchmaker, operating a store in Geelong.

Brownlow Medal
He is known for having the Brownlow Medal named in his honour. It was first awarded in 1924, the season immediately following his death, and is still awarded in today's Australian Football League to the player judged by umpires to be the fairest and best player throughout the year. The Medal is engraved: "Chas Brownlow Trophy".

Honours
In 1997, Brownlow was inducted as an administrator into the Australian Football Hall of Fame.

Other
Brownlow was also secretary of the Geelong Cricket Association from 1896/97 to 1912/13, and treasurer from 1899/1900 to 1912/13.

References

External links

Details of Charles Brownlow's career

Geelong Football Club (VFA) players
1924 deaths
1861 births
Australian Football Hall of Fame inductees
VFL/AFL administrators
Geelong Football Club administrators
People educated at Geelong College
Australian rules footballers from Geelong
Brownlow family